Pata is a village and municipality in Galanta District of  the Trnava Region of south-west Slovakia.
The village lies in central part of Danubian Lowland (in part called Danubian Upland) and in east–west part of Nitra Upland.
The area consists of a mild upland and a shallow valley Jác. The Jarčie watercourse flows through the village.
Nearby villages are Šoporňa, Báb, Pusté Sady, Šintava a Hájske. Pata lies 9 kilometres far from city of Sereď. Village is situated close to R1 expressway, which connect Trnava and Nitra.

History

In historical records the village was first mentioned in 1156, but local settlement is known since prehistory age. In medieval times, Pata was prosperous village with church, Pata was settled by little nobles. After the Battle of Mohács in 1526 the good times passed away and Pata was part of Šintava dominion. Village impoverished. In 1820 the classicistic Church of Nativity of Virgin Mary was built. It is simple building built mostly by local citizens funds. Brincks were provided by landlord of Šintava. In revolution year 1849 a battle between Habsburg army and Hungarian army took place nearby Pata. Event is commemorated by obelisk called Oloment from Austria-Hungary era.
After 1918 the village become a part of Czechoslovakia. During World War II Pata was part of puppet Slovak state, after War again part of Czechoslovakia. Nowadays, Pata is middle sized village of Slovakia. In 21st century new, modern Church of Nativity of Virgin Mary was built.

References

External links

 Official page
 https://web.archive.org/web/20070513023228/http://www.statistics.sk/mosmis/eng/run.html

Villages and municipalities in Galanta District